Edward Hulburd Prudden was a provincial politician from Alberta, Canada. He served as a member of the Legislative Assembly of Alberta from 1917 to 1921 sitting with the Liberal caucus in government.

Political career
Prudden ran for a seat to the Alberta Legislature in the 1917 Alberta general election as a candidate for the provincial Liberals. He won a close race over Conservative candidate George McMorris by 33 votes to hold the seat for his party.

Prudden ran for a second term in the 1921 Alberta general election. He was defeated in a landslide in the two-way race by United Farmers candidate Albert Sanders.

References

External links
Legislative Assembly of Alberta Members Listing

Alberta Liberal Party MLAs
1859 births
1932 deaths